Volaris, legally Concesionaria Vuela Compañía de Aviación S.A.B. de C.V., is a Mexican low-cost airline based in Santa Fe, Álvaro Obregón, Mexico City with its hubs in Guadalajara, Mexico City, and Tijuana, and focus cities in Cancún, León, and Monterrey. It is the country's second largest airline after Aeroméxico and serves domestic and international destinations within the Americas. It is the leading airline in the Mexican domestic airline market, with a market share of over 28% of domestic traffic.

History
The pre-operations phase (founding of the legal entities and setting up of the required infrastructure) started in August 2005 under the name Vuela Airlines. The idea for the airline was formed from the proposed "Vuelamex" project. Major initial shareholders of the company were Grupo Televisa (the world's biggest Spanish-language media conglomerate), Inbursa (an insurance company owned by multi-billionaire Carlos Slim), TACA Airlines and the Discovery Americas Fund. Each of these partners invested 25% of the initial cost of activities, or 100 million USD. In July 2010, it was announced that Televisa and Inbursa had sold their stake in Volaris leaving the ownership of Volaris as follows: TACA Airlines with Roberto and Maria Cristina Kriete (50%), Investment fund Discovery Americas (over 25%) and Indigo Partners: Fund led by former America West CEO Bill Franke.

Ticket sales started on January 12, 2006, and, following the delivery of the airline's first aircraft, the first (non-commercial) flight was operated in February 2006. Scheduled revenue flights were launched on March 13, 2006, with the inaugural flight having been operated from Toluca to Tijuana.

Volaris began service to Mexico City in September 2010 after absorbing flight routes from two defunct Mexican airlines, Aerocalifornia and Mexicana. In March 2011, the airline announced that its hub in Toluca would move to Guadalajara.

On June 5, 2012, the airline launched a frequent flyer program called VClub. It is the membership program that provides special fares, offers, last minute travel deals and other perks. Customers can save up to 40% using the VClub membership. On June 6, 2012, PayPal became a payment alternative for the airline, enabling customers to purchase tickets directly from the airline's website. On September 17, 2012, Volaris announced a codeshare partnership with a German airline, Condor. Passengers of Condor are able to fly to more international destinations.

On March 13, 2013, the airline celebrated its seventh anniversary, offering passengers 70% off all flights, it has done this every year since then. Volaris announced the creation of a subsidiary, Volaris Costa Rica, in March 2016. The subsidiary, based at Juan Santamaría International Airport in the Costa Rican capital of San José, started operations in November 2016.

International operations
In November 2008, Volaris announced a codeshare agreement with U.S.-based low-cost carrier Southwest Airlines.

In April 2009, Volaris announced the start of U.S.-bound flights out of Toluca and Guadalajara (initially to Los Angeles and Oakland) to feed into the hubs of Southwest Airlines. Later on, U.S. flights were also offered from Zacatecas and Morelia, with Monterrey-Los Angeles and Fresno in planning.

On December 13, 2010, Volaris started services between Chicago/Midway and Guadalajara. It was Volaris' fourth international destination, first international service to a secondary airport and the longest route in Volaris' history. After Mexicana de Aviación's shutdown, Volaris took over many of Mexicana's international destinations and flights from its focus city, Guadalajara.

On February 25, 2011, it was announced that Volaris would begin service to Fresno on April 14, 2011. Fresno was Volaris' first US destination where it did not partner with Southwest Airlines. The airline began using Guadalajara International Airport as an American gateway hub in late 2011.

Volaris sought permission to fly between Dallas/Fort Worth and Mexico City, along with a number of other U.S.-Mexico routes. Volaris submitted the request on February 3, 2011 and the U.S. Department of Transportation granted approval on February 11. However, Volaris did not launch the service until over four years later, on April 29, 2015, when it began flights between Dallas/Fort Worth and Guadalajara.

Volaris received approval to fly to San Diego International Airport on July 12, 2012. Volaris then began non-stop flights between Orlando and Guadalajara on July 14, 2012.

Volaris started service between Sacramento and Guadalajara on November 15, 2012.
Volaris began flights between Denver and Mexico City on December 8, 2012.

On February 22, 2013, Volaris and Southwest stopped codesharing. Southwest decided to focus more on the Mexican market with AirTran Airways, instead of codesharing with Volaris.

Volaris began flights between Phoenix and Guadalajara on October 19, 2013.

Volaris began flying to its first destination in Texas, San Antonio, from Guadalajara on December 14, 2013. Volaris also started its new route from Mexico City to San Antonio on September 15, 2017.

Volaris began non-stop flights between Chicago/O'Hare and Mexico City on December 17, 2013. This replaced Volaris' Chicago/Midway-Mexico City flights.

Volaris began flights between Guadalajara and Ontario, California, a reliever airport in the Greater Los Angeles Area, on April 12, 2014.

Volaris applied to fly Mexicana's former Portland to Guadalajara route. The application was granted and service to Portland began on October 6, 2014. Volaris has since taken over Mexicana's former Portland to Morelia route, scheduled to start in 2021.

Volaris began serving its second destination in Florida, Fort Lauderdale–Hollywood International Airport, from Mexico City on December 1, 2014, and then from Guadalajara on December 4, 2014. The airline later ceased flying to Fort Lauderdale and replaced the route with non-stop flights to Miami from Mexico City and Guadalajara.

Volaris began non-stop flights between Reno–Tahoe International Airport and Guadalajara on December 16, 2014.

Volaris planned to launch service to William P. Hobby Airport in Houston, Texas as soon as the new terminal was completed, but the airline chose to begin flying to Houston-Intercontinental from Guadalajara on March 26, 2015, instead.

Volaris began its first non-stop flights to the Northeastern United States, when it began service between New York-JFK and Guadalajara on July 15, 2015, and on March 1, 2017, started non-stop service between Mexico City and New York-JFK.

In the summer of 2015, Volaris launched its first ever international flights outside the Continental United States; to Guatemala on June 18, to San Juan, Puerto Rico on July 2, and to San José, Costa Rica on September 10.

On July 7, 2016, Volaris began service to Seattle from Guadalajara.

On May 9, 2016 the airline announced non stop flights between Monterrey and Dallas/Fort Worth beginning on July 8, 2016.

Volaris began the first service link between Austin and Guadalajara on August 7, 2016.

Volaris has confirmed it does not plan to fly to Santiago de Chile, and rather focus in the US, Central America and domestic markets, after a local newspaper announced the airline had plans to begin operations in South America.

In March 2017, Volaris began non-stop service between Guadalajara and Milwaukee.

On January 16, 2018, Volaris announced a codeshare agreement with American low-cost carrier Frontier Airlines.

On November 17, 2018, Volaris started flights to Albuquerque from Guadalajara. Volaris was the first Mexican airline to fly to Albuquerque since Aeroméxico in 2009. This flight was discontinued in June 2019, along with a very short-lived (2 week) Albuquerque-Chihuahua flight 

On November 22, 2018, Volaris started flights to Charlotte from Guadalajara.

Corporate affairs
The airline is headquartered in Santa Fe, Álvaro Obregón, Mexico City. It formerly had its headquarters on the first floor of Prolongación Paseo de la Reforma 490 in Peña Blanca, Santa Fe.

Controversies

Volaris has faced multiple class-action lawsuits due to failure to properly refund flights canceled due to the COVID-19 pandemic.

Destinations

Volaris operates scheduled flights to Mexico and elsewhere in the Americas from its hub at Guadalajara International Airport in Guadalajara, Mexico City International Airport in Mexico City, and Tijuana International Airport in Tijuana, and focus cities in Cancún International Airport in Cancún, Bajío International Airport in León, and Monterrey International Airport in Monterrey.

Operating bases
Volaris operates crew bases at the following airports:
Cancún
Culiacán
Guadalajara 
León/Del Bajío
Mexico City
Monterrey
Morelia
Tijuana

Codeshare agreements
Condor
Frontier Airlines

Fleet

, the Volaris fleet consists of the following aircraft:

Volaris became the first North American operator of the Airbus A320neo in September 2016.

On November 15, 2017 during the Dubai Airshow, Indigo Partners announced an order for 430 aircraft of the Airbus A320neo family of which 80 will be for Volaris as follows: 46 A320neo and 34 A321neo.

On November 14, 2021 during the Dubai Airshow, Volaris announced an order for 39 A321neo. Additionally an existing order for 20 A320neo was converted into A321neo.

Volaris has one of the youngest fleets in the Americas, averaging 5.3 years.

Services

Cabin and onboard services
Volaris cabins are configured in a single class, high density layout.

Volaris does not provide complimentary meals or drinks on its flights. Passengers may purchase items on board from the "Entre nubes" buy on board program. Onboard sales are an important part of the airline's ancillary revenue; items such as snacks, pillows, blankets and Volaris-branded items are sold on board. The airline's monthly inflight magazine is called "V de Volaris".

The airline had previously provided in-flight entertainment (IFE) in most aircraft, utilizing drop-down screens on its Airbus aircraft; by 2019, all use of IFE had been discontinued.

Frequent flyer program
VClub is Volaris' frequent flyer program. It gives members exclusive deals on flights, baggage and packages. The airline offers individual and group memberships, with the option to pay monthly or annually. In addition, Volaris offers VPass, similar to Spirit's "$9 Fare Club". It offers a set subscription price, and charges customers only for taxes and additional services. Further, customers can book codeshare flights and earn points through fellow ultra-low-cost carrier, Frontier Airlines.

Corporate identity

Trivia
 Two Volaris safety videos were made: one featured actress Claudia Lizaldi while one featured young children demonstrating the safety procedures. As of 2018, both videos have been retired.
 Every new plane has a person's name on it, for example, one plane may have "Samuel" written on it, while another plane may have "Luisa" written on it. Recently, some planes have been named after families, e.g. ""Los Capistrán", or after new countries they begin service to, e.g. "Guatemala".

Brand image
The Volaris logo, since its launch in 2005, has been a colorful, pixelated star against a black background. It represents the north star, Polaris, after which the airline's name is derived from.

Advertising slogans
Volaris has used several slogans over the years:
2005–2008 – "Lo quieres, lo tienes" (You want it, you got it.)
2008–2012 – "Vive viajando" (Live travelling)
2013–2017 – "Tu decides" (You decide)(Launched after the introduction of the "clean fare", which no longer included the cost of food, baggage, or seat selection in the airline's ticket prices.) 
2015 – "Queremos que todo el mundo vuele" (We want the whole world to fly)
2015–present – "Precios que te hacen viajar" (Prices that make you travel)
2016 – "Avión a precio de camión" (The plane at the price of a bus)
November 2018 – present – "Don't just fly, vuela"

See also
List of airlines of Mexico
List of low-cost airlines

References

External links

Airlines of Mexico
Low-cost carriers
Mexican brands
Companies based in Mexico City
Álvaro Obregón, Mexico City
Airlines established in 2005
Avianca
Latin American and Caribbean Air Transport Association
Companies listed on the New York Stock Exchange
Mexican companies established in 2005